Lyudmila Konstantinovna Sukhnat (born 1938) was a Soviet-Belarusian Politician (Communist).

She served as Minister of Education from 1985 to 1988.

References

Living people
1938 births
20th-century Belarusian women politicians
20th-century Belarusian politicians
Soviet women in politics
Belarusian communists
Women government ministers of Belarus
Place of birth missing (living people)